Ubon Ratchathani is one of the four major cities of Isan (with Khorat/Nakhon Ratchasima, Udon Thani, and Khon Kaen), also known as the "big four of Isan." It is known as Ubon for short. The name means "royal lotus city". Ubon is the administrative center of Ubon Ratchathani Province.

As of 2006, the Ubon Ratchathani urban area had a population of about 200,000. This included 85,000 in Thetsaban Nakhon Ubon Ratchathani (Ubon municipality), 30,000 each in Thetsaban Mueang Warin Chamrap (Warin municipality) and Thetsaban Tambon Kham Yai, 24,000 in Thetsaban Tambon Saen Suk, 10,000 each in Thetsaban Tambon Pathum and Tambon Kham Nam Saep, and 6,000 in Thetsaban Tambon Ubon.

History

The city was founded in the late 18th century by Thao Kham Phong, descendant of Phra Wo and Phra Ta, who escaped from King Siribunsan of Vientiane into the Siam Kingdom during the reign of King Taksin the Great. Later, Thao Kham Phong was appointed to be "" (Thai: พระประทุมวงศา) and the first ruler of Ubon Ratchathani. In 1792, Ubon Ratchathani became a province and was also the administrative center of the monthon Isan. Until 1972, Ubon Ratchathani was the largest province of Thailand by area. Yasothon Province was split off from Ubon Ratchathani Province in 1972, followed by Amnat Charoen Province in 1993. Ubon Ratchathani Province now ranks fifth in area.

The city was attacked by French forces during the 1940 Franco-Thai War.

Ubon grew extensively during World War II when Japanese forces brought in prisoners of war by rail from Kanchanaburi, the survivors of the Burma Railway. One legacy of this is a monument in the city's central Thung Si Meuang Park, erected by British prisoners of war in gratitude to the citizens of Ubon Ratchathani for assisting them. During the Vietnam War, United States armed forces constructed Ubon Royal Thai Air Force Base, which is now also a dual-use commercial airport.

Some of the city's religious buildings show the influence of Lao architecture.

The city has branches of the National Archives of Thailand and National Museum of Thailand.

The world-famous meditation teacher Ajahn Chah, teacher of Ajahn Sumedho, was born in Ubon Ratchathani.

Geography

Ubon Ratchathani sits on the north bank of the Mun River. The south bank of the river is occupied by the suburb of Warin Chamrap (Warin for short), which is effectively incorporated into the city.

Climate
Ubon Ratchathani has a tropical wet and dry climate (Köppen climate classification Aw). Winters are dry and very warm. The monsoon season runs from late April to October, with heavy rain and somewhat cooler temperatures during the day, although nights remain warm.

Festivals
Ubon Ratchathani is best known for its annual Candle Festival, held in July to mark the beginning of the rainy season retreat for Buddhists, Wan Khao Phansa, also called Buddhist Lent. One day prior, candles are taken to Thung Si Mueang, the central park in the middle of the city; the park is decorated and exhibited in the evening. On the same evening, there are many smaller processions during which candles are carried to practically all Buddhist temples in Thailand. The main procession in Ubon Ratchathani takes place early the next morning.

Sights and attractions

The province is known for its strong Buddhist tradition, particularly the practice of monks dwelling in the forest ( Phra thudong, pilgrimage, lit. "hiking monk"). Wat Nong Pah Pong, for example, is a Buddhist forest monastery in the Thai Forest Tradition, which was established by Venerable Ajahn Chah Subhaddo in 1954. Ajahn Chah's style of teaching and personality had a notable ability to reach people of other nationalities. Many foreigners came to learn from, train under, and be ordained by Ajahn Chah. Wat Pa Nanachat (International Forest Monastery) was established in 1975. It currently has over fifty monks representing twenty-three nationalities.

Other Buddhist temples in and around the city include Wat Thung Si Mueang, in the center of the city, featuring an old wooden library on stilts in a small lake, and Wat Nong Bua near the Big C mall, featuring a chedi modelled on Bodh Gaya in India.

Education

High schools
There are two major high schools in the central part of Ubon Ratchathani. These two schools are more than 100 years old.

Benchama Maharacha School (Thai: เบ็ญจะมะมหาราช), which offers an English language stream.
Narinukun School, which offers an English language stream.
Ave Maria School.
Assumption School, next to the Tesco-Lotus store on Chayangkun Road is a private Catholic school.

Higher education

Ubon Ratchathani Rajabhat University, an upgraded technical college just north of the central city. 
Ratchathani University, a private university with a large campus between the km5 post on the Ring Road and the Mun River.
Mahachulalongkorn Ratchawitthayalai University is a Bangkok Buddhist university with a small campus on Wat Mahawanaram in the city, and a new and much larger, but isolated campus in Tambon Krasop, northeast of the Ring Road. 
North Eastern Polytechnic College, with a campus on Chayangkun Road near the Big C Mall. 
Ubon Polytechnic College, with a campus on Chongkonnithan Road west of the city centre.
Ratchathani Technology Vocational College, north of the Ring Road on Ubon 2 Road. 
Sukhothai Thammathirat Open University, while Bangkok-based, operates the small Sun Witthaya Phatthana Ubon Ratchathani centre next to the National Archives, a block west of the Ring Road. 
Ubon Ratchathani Technical College is near SK Mall. 
Ubon Ratchathani Vocational College, on Phrommarat Road in the city centre. 
Boromarajonani College of nursing Sappasithipasong, a block east of Sapphasit Prasong hospital.

Notable people
 
 
Parinya Saenkhammuen (born 1983), footballer
Mina Tanaka (born 1994), Japanese footballer

Transportation

Airport
As well as being a commercial facility, Ubon Ratchathani Airport (IATA: UBP) is also an active Royal Thai Air Force (RTAF) base, the home of 2nd Air Division/21st Wing Air Combat Command. During the Vietnam War, US and Australian squadrons were based here.

Bus terminal
Nakhonchai Air operates its own private bus terminal just across from the main bus station.

Railway terminal

The eastern terminus of the north-eastern railway line from Hua Lamphong Railway Station, Bangkok's central station, is in Warin Chamrap. The rail-head reached Warin in April 1930. The terminal station is called Ubon Ratchathani, but is in Warin Chamrap municipality, which is south of Ubon Ratchathani.

Sister cities
 Rome, Italy
 Kinshasa, Democratic Republic of the Congo
 Paris, France
 Kigali, Rwanda

Gallery

References

External links

 
 

Isan
Populated places in Ubon Ratchathani province